Vanadium is a chemical element with symbol V and atomic number 23.

Vanadium may also refer to:

Vanadium (band), an Italian heavy metal band
Vanadium Corporation of America, a defunct chemical company

See also